Andre Begemann and Jonathan Eysseric were the defending champions but chose not to defend their title.

Rameez Junaid and Purav Raja won the title after defeating Timur Khabibulin and Vladyslav Manafov 7–6(7–4), 4–6, [10–7] in the final.

Seeds

Draw

References
 Main Draw

Amex-Istanbul Challenger - Doubles
2018 Doubles